Hesston is an unincorporated community in Galena Township, LaPorte County, Indiana.

History
Originally called Mayes' Corners after Matthew Mayes opened a blacksmith in 1835. In 1857, Valentine Smith established a sawmill west of Mayes' Corner near the Galena River. It burned in 1862. In 1865, the Christian Church established a congregation in this area with Rev. Caleb Davis leading the congregation, before he moved to Michigan.  P.M. Hess came to the township in 1856 from New York and began farming.  He ran a sawmill and operated a store, contributing his name to the location.  A post office was established at Hesston in 1877, and remained in operation until it was discontinued in 1900. The community was named for P. M. Hess, an early settler.

Culture
The Hesston Steam Museum, which contains several railroads with multiple track gauges including  narrow gauge,  narrow gauge,  gauge, and  gauge, is located just west of Hesston.

References

2 ft gauge railways in the United States
3 ft gauge railways in the United States
7½ in gauge railways in the United States
Unincorporated communities in Indiana
Unincorporated communities in LaPorte County, Indiana